Felix Seiwald (born 20 August 2000) is an Austrian professional footballer who plays as a left-back for First Vienna on loan from Ried.

Career
Seiwald is a product of the youth academies of Flachau and Ried. He began his senior career with the reserves of Ried in 2019, signing his first professional contract on 17 June 2019 before being promoted to the first team in 2020. On 8 February 2021, he joined Vorwärts Steyr on loan for 1.5 years. He was recalled early to Ried on 30 June 2021 to train with their first team, earning Vorwärts Steyr some compensation.

International career
Seiwald is a youth international for Austria, having been called up to represent the Austria U21s in October 2021.

Honours
Ried
2. Liga: 2019–20

References

External links
 
 OEFB Profile

2000 births
Living people
Footballers from Salzburg
Austrian footballers
Austria under-21 international footballers
Association football fullbacks
SV Ried players
SK Vorwärts Steyr players
First Vienna FC players
Austrian Football Bundesliga players
2. Liga (Austria) players
Austrian Regionalliga players